Glenn Naylor (born 11 August 1972) is an English former footballer who made more than 300 appearances in the Football League playing for York City and Darlington. He was forced to retire in 2003 due to injury.

Career
Naylor played as a left back at school, but became a prolific striker in junior football and progressed under York City's Youth Training Scheme.

References

1972 births
Living people
People from Howden
Footballers from the East Riding of Yorkshire
English footballers
Association football forwards
York City F.C. players
Darlington F.C. players
English Football League players